Igor Fyodorovich Belza or Boelza (Игорь Фёдорович Бэлза; 8 February 1904 – 5 January 1994) was a Soviet music historian and composer who wrote 4 symphonies, 5 piano sonatas, 2 cello sonatas, a string quartet, and several film scores for Alexander Dovzhenko. He was the father of Svyatoslav Belza, a showman and a TV personality.

Boelza was born in Kielce into a noble Polish family which moved to Kyiv after the outbreak of the First World War. He studied at the Kyiv Conservatory with Boris Lyatoshynsky. Belza delivered lectures in the Kyiv State University until the German invasion of Ukraine forced him to move to Moscow and join the staff of the Moscow Conservatory.

Boelza authored a slate of books about Mozart (1941), Alexander Borodin (1944), Antonín Dvořák (1949), Reinhold Glière (1955), Maria Szymanowska (1956), Vítězslav Novák (1957), Frédéric Chopin (1960), Michał Kleofas Ogiński (1965), Alexander Scriabin (1982) and Karol Szymanowski (1984). He received a Doctorate, honoris causa, from the Charles University of Prague, in 1967.

References

Publications 
 Igor Boelza. Handbook of Soviet Musicians. Westport, Conn.: Greenwood Press, 1943 / 1971. .

1904 births
1994 deaths
20th-century classical musicians
20th-century composers
20th-century Russian historians
20th-century Russian male musicians
20th-century Russian male writers
People from Kielce
People from Kielce Governorate
Kyiv Conservatory alumni
Academic staff of Kyiv Conservatory
Academic staff of Moscow Conservatory
Officers of the Order of Polonia Restituta
Recipients of the Decoration of Honor Meritorious for Polish Culture
Recipients of the Order of the Red Banner of Labour
Male film score composers
Music historians
Russian film score composers
Russian literary historians
Russian male writers
Russian musicologists
Soviet film score composers
Soviet literary historians
Soviet male writers
Soviet musicologists
Burials at Vagankovo Cemetery
20th-century musicologists